County routes in Chautauqua County, New York, are signed with the Manual on Uniform Traffic Control Devices-standard yellow-on-blue pentagon route marker. Even numbered routes are west–east roads, while odd numbered routes are south–north roads. One exception is the north–south County Route 380 (CR 380), part of which was once New York State Route 380 (NY 380). The numbers increase roughly from southwest to northeast across the county. All roads maintained by Chautauqua County are assigned a county highway number; this number is unsigned. Each county route comprises one or more county highways; however, not all county highways are part of a signed county route.

County routes

County highways
Every county-maintained road is assigned an unsigned county highway number for inventory purposes. The majority of county highways are part of signed county routes; however, some serve as internal designations for county-maintained sections of New York state touring routes while others are not posted with any designation. Those not part of any county routes are listed below.

See also

County routes in New York

Notes

References